John Felton Parish (July 4, 1933 – August 9, 1982) was an American mass murderer who shot dead six people and wounded three others at two warehouses in Grand Prairie, Texas, United States on August 9, 1982. Afterwards, while driving a hijacked semi-trailer truck, he led police on a high-speed chase through Grand Prairie downtown that ended only when he broke through a police barricade, injuring an officer, and crashed into a building. He was subsequently killed by police during a shootout.

It was the worst shooting rampage in Dallas-Fort Worth history at that time.

Life
Parish was born in Dallas County, Texas on July 4, 1933. He was married and had two children, though he was estranged from his wife and had lost a child-custody battle against her shortly before the shooting. Also the same year his brother needed a second kidney implant and his older sister died from cancer.

Parish, who had no police record and was described by his supervisors as an easy-going person, had been a trucker for 20 years and worked for Jewel T warehouse for eight months before joining the Western Transportation Company in September 1980. The people at Jewel T complained about him, calling him a troublemaker, and Jewel T supervisor Richard T. Svoboda demanded that Parish should be taken off a contract job Western Transportation had with Jewel T, whereupon he was banned from making deliveries for said company.

In the two weeks prior to the shooting Parish had a pay dispute with Western Transportation and had complained to supervisor Eddie Ulrich that he was owed $1,600 of outstanding pay. Ulrich rejected his claims, explaining that he had earned less because he had worked less. Nonetheless Parish felt, according to his brother and his friends, mistreated and was tired of it, but also stated that they could work it out, if they talked to him like a man, and didn't treat him like a fool.

Shooting spree
At approximately 8:00 a.m. on August 9, Parish, armed with a shortened M1 carbine, a .25-caliber semi-automatic pistol, and a .38-caliber revolver, entered the Western Transportation Company building in the central business district of Grand Prairie, to discuss for the last time with his supervisor Eddie Ulrich his payment dispute. When the discussion did not go to his liking, Parish killed Ulrich, as well as truck driver Martin Moran and operations manager Moody Smith, before stealing a bobtail truck and driving to the Western Transportation Company office half a block down the street. There he killed executive secretary Wyvonne Kohler and wounded receptionist Ruth James with shots in her shoulder and neck, as well as operations manager Burnett Hart with a shot to the head. He also took office worker Vicki Smallwood hostage for a while, to find an executive named Mike, threatening: "If he's not in, you're dead." Though, after his search proved to be of no avail, Parish decided to let his hostage go, when realizing that she was the wife of an acquainted mechanic.

Parish next drove to Jewel T warehouse about four miles away, arriving there a few minutes later. There he killed district sales manager Dave Bahl, and then went to the shipping office, where he was confronted by warehouse supervisor Richard 
Svoboda. Parish put his revolver to Svoboda's jaw and killed him, and then shot him again in the face when he was lying on the floor. Parish also wounded shipping supervisor Robert Sarabia after chasing him. 
Eventually Parish left the building and approached an 18-wheeler tractor-trailer loaded with cookies. Its driver, Carl Lorentz, at the sight of the gunman jumped out of the truck, breaking his foot.

Hijacking the truck Parish left the compound of Jewel T warehouse and, chased by police by now, raced at 70 mph through downtown Grand Prairie. After 1 1/2 miles Parish neared a police barricade, where he was shot at by police officer Alan T. Patton and crashed into a police car, knocking the officer across the street. Patton suffered multiple fractures and a punctured lung. The truck then knocked down a utility pole and crashed, together with another car, into a building owned by the E.L. Murphy Trucking Company. Upon hitting the wall the truck overturned. Parish crawled out of his vehicle, shooting at the officers, and made his way into the building through a hole in a wall, where he was killed by police with seven or eight shots at 8:27 a.m.

During the shooting Parish had used all three of his weapons, mostly the M1 carbine (which he fired about 28 times) and his revolver; only one shot was fired with his semi-automatic pistol.

Victims
 Dave Bahl, 28, district sales manager at Jewel T warehouse
 Wyvonne Kohler, 45, executive secretary at Western Transportation Company
 Martin Douglas Moran, 30, truck driver for Western Transportation Company
 Moody Charles Smith, 58, operations manager at Western Transportation Company
 Richard T. Svoboda, 37, Distribution Manager, at Jewel T Discount Grocery Warehouse. 
 Eddie Eugene Ulrich, 40, supervisor at Western Transportation Company

References

External links
 Texas trucker goes on rampage after dispute over wages; kills six, Jet (August 30, 1982)
 Trucker kills 6, hurts 5 in Texas rampage, St. Petersburg Times (August 10, 1982)
 Berserk Trucker kills six, The Bryan Times (August 10, 1982)
 Killer of 6 was "tired of being pushed", Ocala Star-Banner (August 10, 1982)
 Texas killing spree ends in 5 deaths at hand of angry man, The Miami News (August 10, 1982)
 It was a bloody week in Texas, Spartanburg Herald (August 16, 1982)
 Murderer of 6 angry over pay, police say, Reading Eagle (August 10, 1982)

1933 births
1982 deaths
1982 mass shootings in the United States
American mass murderers
American spree killers
August 1982 events in the United States
Crimes in Texas
Deaths by firearm in Texas
Mass murder in 1982
Mass shootings in the United States
Murder in Texas
People from Dallas County, Texas
People shot dead by law enforcement officers in the United States